Karl Friedrich Köppen (26 April 1808 – 26 April 1863) was a German teacher and political journalist. He was one of the Young Hegelians.

Life
Köppen was from a born in a pastor's family in Altmark. He studied theology at the University of Berlin from 1827 to 1831, but later turned to religio-critical Hegelianism. After his studies and military service in 1833, he taught at the secondary school Dorotheenstädtischer. In 1837, he met Karl Marx, with whom he developed a close friendship. 

In 1840 he became one of the most active associates of Arnold Ruge, the founder of the Hallischen Jahrbücher (1841: Deutsche Jahrbücher). He wrote many reviews on political and scientific literature. Contemporary journalistic practice has been strongly influenced by his opinions reviews. He thus began a renewal of the Enlightenment as Köppen's criticism of classical literature, idealist philosophy and Romanticism. Köppen's views were deeply indebted to Karl Marx and he dedicated his book Frederick the Great and his Opponents to Marx.

He died in Berlin.

Works
Literarische Einleitung in die nordische Mythologie. Berlin: Bechtold und Hartje, 1837 
Friedrich der Große und seine Widersacher. Leipzig: Verlag Otto Wigand, 1840 
Die Religion des Buddha. 2 vol., Berlin: F. Schneider 1857–1859. Vol. 1, Vol. 2
Hexen und Hexenprozesse. Zur Geschichte des Aberglaubens und des inquisitorischen Prozesses. 2. Aufl., Leipzig: O. Wigand,  1858
Ausgewählte Schriften. edited by Heinz Pepperle. 2 vol., Berlin: Akademie-Verlag, 2003

References

Further reading
Hirsch, Helmut (1936). Zur Genesis der Karl Friedrich Köppen-Forschung. Ein unverzichtbarer Rechenschaftsbericht. In: Lars Lambrecht (ed.): Philosophie, Literatur und Politik vor den Revolutionen von 1848. Zur Herausbildung der demokratischen Bewegungen in Europa (= Forschungen zum Junghegelianismus. Vol. 1), P. Lang, Frankfurt am Main, pp. 355-. ISBN 3-631-30567-2
Mode, H. (1978). C. F. Köppen, Pioneer of German Buddhist Research. A Friend of Karl Marx and Friedrich Engels. In: The Maha Bodhi. International Buddhist Monthly. Calcutta 1/1978
Schmidt, Walter (1986). Karl Friedrich Köppen, Friedrich Engels und die Terreur in der Großen Französischen Revolution. In: Beiträge zur Marx-Engels-Forschung 26, 15–23. ISSN 0232-8577

External links
 Literature by and about Karl Friedrich Köppen in the catalog of the German National Library

1808 births
1863 deaths
German philosophers
Hegelian philosophers
 Humboldt University of Berlin alumni